A plant is a kingdom of mainly multicellular, predominantly photosynthetic eukaryotes.

Plant or Planted may also refer to:

Manufacturing and engineering
 Chemical plant
 Physical plant, often just called "plant", a facility's infrastructure (i.e., "Plant Room")
 Plant, any type of mobile construction machinery
 Plant, another name for a factory (short for "manufacturing plant")
 Processing plant, in process manufacturing

Arts, entertainment, and media
 The Plant (film), a 1995 television film
 The Plant (newspaper), student newspaper at Dawson College in Montreal, Quebec, Canada
 The Plant (novel), unfinished serial novel by Stephen King
 "The Plant" (Schitt's Creek)
 Plant (snooker), used in British English to refer to a type of combination shot
 "Plant" (song), a 2020 song by Sejeong, from the album of the same name
 The Plants, a 1950s doo-wop group
 "A.K.A. The Plant" (Weeds episode)
 PLANT, fictional organization in the anime series Gundam SEED and its sequel

People with the surname
 Henry B. Plant (1819–1899), American railroad manager
 John Plant (YouTube) Australian YouTuber
 Richard Plant (disambiguation), multiple people
 Robert Plant (born 1948), lead singer of Led Zeppelin
 Thomas Gustave Plant (1859–1941), British-American manufacturer
 William Plant (disambiguation), multiple people

Roles
 Plant, a shill or a stooge
 Plant, a spy or a mole
 Plant, a professional wrestling term for a person hired to pose as a fan who may become involved in the events
 Plant, the creative and innovative team role in Meredith Belbin's Team Role Inventories

Other uses
 Plant (control theory), a notion in control theory
 Plant (restaurant), a vegan restaurant in Asheville, North Carolina, US
 Plant, Arkansas, a community in the United States
 Planted (book), a 2018 cookbook by Chantelle Nicholson
 A frameup to falsely incriminate someone

See also

 La Plant, South Dakota, U.S.
 Laplante (disambiguation), a surname
 
 
 Plante (disambiguation)